"Breakdown" is a song by the American heavy metal band Queensrÿche. It was released as a single in support of their 1999 album Q2K.

Formats and track listing 
US CD single (PRCD 9040)
"Breakdown" (radio edit) – 3:08
"Breakdown" (album version) – 4:12

Charts

References

External links 
 

1999 songs
1999 singles
Queensrÿche songs
Atlantic Records singles
Songs written by Eddie Jackson (musician)
Songs written by Scott Rockenfield
Songs written by Geoff Tate
Songs written by Michael Wilton
American hard rock songs